Asemeia apopetala is a species of flowering plant in the milkwort family commonly known as Brandegee milkwort or rama mora. It is a shrub or a small tree characterized by showy pink to magenta flowers that bloom from September to November or any time of year with ample rainfall. It was first described in 1889 and is endemic to Baja California Sur, Mexico. It is the type for the subgenus Apopetala of Asemeia.

Distribution and habitat 
This species is endemic to Baja California Sur, Mexico. It ranges from the Sierra de San Francisco in the northern part of the state south through the Sierra de la Giganta and the Sierra de la Laguna of the Cape region. It is typically found growing on rocky hillsides and canyon walls.

References

External links 

 Polygala apopetala at SEINet

Polygalaceae

Flora of Baja California Sur
Natural history of the Peninsular Ranges
Taxa named by Townshend Stith Brandegee
Plants described in 1889